Raymond VI (October 27, 1156 – August 2, 1222) was Count of Toulouse and Marquis of Provence from 1194 to 1222. He was also  Count of Melgueil (as Raymond IV) from 1173 to 1190.

Early life
Raymond was born at Saint-Gilles, Gard, the son of Raymond V and Constance of France. His maternal grandparents were Louis VI of France and his second wife Adélaide de Maurienne. His maternal uncles included Louis VII of France. In 1194 he succeeded his father as count of Toulouse. He immediately re-established peace with both Alfonso II of Aragon and with the Trencavel family.

Marriages
He was married six times:

 On December 11, 1172, to Ermessende of Pelet, Countess of Melgueil. She died in 1176 without issue.
 In 1178 to Beatrice of Béziers, sister of Roger II Trencavel. She left Raymond and retired to a nunnery. Raymond and Beatrice had one daughter.
Constance of Toulouse, who was married first to King Sancho VII of Navarre, and secondly to Pierre-Bermond II of Sauve, lord of Anduze.
 In 1193 to Bourgogne de Lusignan, daughter of Amaury II, King of Cyprus. She was repudiated in 1196.
In October 1196 at Rouen to Joan Plantagenet, daughter of Henry II of England and Eleanor of Aquitaine. Their marriage included Richard I's renunciation of his claim to Toulouse, ending the feud with the ducal house of Aquitaine. She died on September 4, 1199, in childbirth as a veiled nun at Fontevraud Abbey. Joan and Raymond VI had two children.
Raymond VII, Count of Toulouse (1197–1249); and
Joan of Toulouse (1198–1255), second wife of Bernard II de la Tour, Lord of la Tour.
 In 1200 to the daughter of Isaac Komnenos of Cyprus. They divorced in late 1202, as she had remarried to Thierry of Flanders by early 1203.
 In January 1204 to Eleanor of Aragon, daughter of King Alfonso II of Aragon and Sancha of Castile.

Problems with the Church
Raymond VI was arguably the first target of the Albigensian crusade.

Raymond VI held vast territories but his control of them was problematic. Aside from theoretically owing allegiance to the King of France, Raymond held Provence as a vassal of the Holy Roman Emperor. Henry II of England controlled neighboring Aquitaine through his wife Eleanor of Aquitaine, who had a claim to Toulouse through her grandmother, Philippa of Toulouse, daughter of William IV, Count of Toulouse. Alfonso II of Aragon was involved in the affairs of Languedoc, stimulating emigration from the north to colonize newly reconquered lands in Aragon.

In Toulouse, Raymond maintained the communal freedoms, extended exemptions from taxation, and extended his protection to the communal territory. A poet and a man of culture, he hated war but did not lack energy.

According to Henri Pirenne, "At the end of the 12th century Languedoc was swarming with those mystics who aspired to lead the Church and the age back to apostolic simplicity, condemning both the religious hierarchy and the social order". At first Innocent III tried to deal with the Cathars by peaceful conversion, sending into the affected regions a number of legates or representatives. Count Raymond declined to assist, although constantly embroiled with his vassals, and given the autonomy of the towns, Kenneth Setton questions whether Raymond "could have coped effectively with the challenge of heresy even if he had wished to do so".

The legates sent from Rome and France received little support as they were considered foreign reformers. Papal legate Pierre de Castelnau was sent to address Raymond's tolerance for the practice of the Cathars, but withdrew for six months in 1206 out of concerns for his safety.

Pierre's assassination on January 15, 1208, led to Raymond's excommunication.

After the capture and massacre of Béziers, the siege and capture of Carcassonne, and the death of Raymond Roger Trencavel, all in 1209, he moved his camp, was again excommunicated by the Council of Montpellier in 1211, and tried to organize resistance against the Albigensian Crusade. More of a diplomat than a soldier, he was unable to stop the advance of Simon de Montfort, who conquered Toulouse. Following Battle of Muret, Raymond was exiled to England under his former brother-in-law John, King of England.

In November 1215, Raymond and his son (the later Raymond VII, Count of Toulouse) were in Rome with Raymond-Roger, Count of Foix on the occasion of the Fourth Lateran Council to vindicate themselves and dispute the loss of their territories. Raymond's son-in-law, Pierre-Bermond II of Sauve, was also there to lay claim to the county of Toulouse, but this claim failed. Raymond and his son went from Rome to Genoa and thence to Marseille in February 1216. Raymond's son set out from Marseille to regain the family territories in Provence; in May 1216 he besieged Beaucaire and captured it on August 24.

Meanwhile, Raymond went to Aragon, hoping to rally support. From there he engaged in secret negotiations with leaders in Toulouse during 1216. Simon de Montfort possibly believed that Raymond was on his way to the city in September 1216; at any rate he returned in great haste from Beaucaire and conducted a partial sack of the city, apparently intended as punishment. Finally, on September 12, 1217, Raymond re-entered Toulouse again. Simon de Montfort immediately besieged the city once more. Simon was killed during the siege (25 June 25, 1218); his son Amaury VI of Montfort took his place, and for five years the Crusade faltered. The failure of Louis VIII's campaigns, from 1219 to 1226, finally permitted Raymond, and his son and successor, to recover most of their territories.

Raymond VI is represented as one of four figures on the ceiling of the Minnesota Supreme Court in the United States. His painting is next to Moses, Confucius, and Socrates, each painting representing an aspect of law. Raymond VI's painting is entitled "The Adjustment of Conflicting Interests", and the scene is of Raymond VI of Toulouse standing before the papal legate in 1208. Raymond argued successfully for city freedoms, extended exemptions from taxation, and protection of the communal territory from the church. The paintings were made by John LaFarge in 1903.

References

Sources

External links

Raymond VI entry at the Catholic Encyclopedia

1156 births
1222 deaths
People from Saint-Gilles, Gard
People excommunicated by the Catholic Church
People of the Albigensian Crusade
Counts of Toulouse
Dukes of Narbonne
Margraves of Provence
Occitan nobility
Catharism
13th-century peers of France